Leigh Granville Palin (born 12 September 1965) is an English former footballer who played in the Football League for Bradford City, Burnley, Hull City, Rochdale, Shrewsbury Town and Stoke City. His father, Granville, was also a professional footballer.

Career
Born in Worcester, he started his career with Aston Villa. He never played a league game for Aston Villa, and following a short loan spell with Shrewsbury Town, he moved to Nottingham Forest, where he also failed to reach the first team. After a short stint in Hong Kong where he played for South China A.A., scoring 9 goals in 16 appearances, he moved to Bradford City, where his career took off and in three season with the "Bantams" Palin played 94 matches, scoring thirteen goals and also played in the Second Division play-off against Middlesbrough in the 1987–88 season.

He then joined Mick Mills at Stoke City in 1989–90 but Stoke were having a terrible season and were well on their way to relegation and Mills was sacked in November 1989 and in came Alan Ball. Ball made a large number of changes to the squad in an attempt to avoid the drop and in March Palin was allowed to leave for Hull City. He spent three years at Hull and had a brief loan spell with Rochdale followed by a short spell at Burnley, before he moved to Scottish football with Partick Thistle. He dropped into non-league football with Tadcaster Albion.

Career statistics
Source:

A.  The "Other" column constitutes appearances and goals in the Football League play-offs, Football League Trophy and Full Members Cup.

References

External links
 

1965 births
Living people
Sportspeople from Worcester, England
English footballers
Aston Villa F.C. players
Shrewsbury Town F.C. players
Nottingham Forest F.C. players
Bradford City A.F.C. players
Stoke City F.C. players
Hull City A.F.C. players
Rochdale A.F.C. players
Burnley F.C. players
Partick Thistle F.C. players
English Football League players
Scottish Football League players
Tadcaster Albion A.F.C. players
Association football midfielders